Statistics of Allsvenskan in season 1937/1938.

Overview
The league was contested by 12 teams, with IK Sleipner winning the championship. Following Sleipner in the table were three clubs all with the same points, thus leaving goal ratio as the tie breaker (as was the case until the 1940–41 season).

League table

Results

Footnotes

References 

Allsvenskan seasons
1937–38 in Swedish association football leagues
Sweden